Pella fauveli is a species of rove beetle in the family Staphylinidae. It is found in Central America and North America.

References

Further reading

 

Aleocharinae
Articles created by Qbugbot
Beetles described in 1883